The New Music Seminar (NMS) is a Music Conference and Festival held annually each June in New York City. The New Music Seminar originally ran from 1980 to 1995 and was relaunched in 2009. NMS features over 150 CEOs and other executives, presidents, and other leaders in the emerging music business along with over 100 artist performances.

In 2012, NMS hosted the first New York Music Festival in collaboration with the New York City Mayor's Office of Media & Entertainment declaration of the city’s first New York Music Week. The festival took place in 17 venues throughout Manhattan and Brooklyn.

New Music Seminar 2015 took place June 21-23 in New York City.

History

1980–95
In June 1980, Tom Silverman, Mark Josephson, Joel Webber, Danny Heaps, and Scott Anderson brought 220 people together at a New York City rehearsal studio to discuss challenges in the music business. The event grew in subsequent years to act as a catalyst for change in it. The New Music Seminar added music showcases and a festival, initially called "New York Nights" and later, "New Music Nights." These were held in various New York City clubs. At its peak, the first series of seminars attracted more than 8,000 participants from 35 countries.

In 6th August of 1984, the Seminar received the beginner singer and future popstar, Madonna.

Haoui Montaug was panel director of the NMS at the time of his 1991 death. Following his death, the NMS inaugurated the Haoui Montag New Music Awards in his honour.

2009
In 2009, the New Music Seminar was relaunched by Tom Silverman and former New Music Seminar staffer Dave Lory.

New York CIty
The New Music Seminar returned as a one-day event to its hometown in the 2009 summer on July 21. It was an event that created the template for music conferences by combining business and shows. Held at the New York University Steinhardt's Skirball Center for the Performing Arts, the program consisted of a keynote, four educational sessions on how to combine new and old methods with technology for career success, and an artists' showcase.

Chicago
Following reviews from the New York City conference on July 21, the New Music Seminar went to Chicago for the first time on October 6 at the historic Park West.

On October 6 in Chicago, the reincarnated New Music Seminar kicked off with keynote address by Michael Spiegelman, head of Yahoo! Music, and was followed by four panel discussions:
 Welcome to the Music Business; everything you know is wrong. Redefining Success. 1000 True Fans and the Fan Relationship Pyramid.
 Expose Yourself: Marketing for the next music business; MySpace, Facebook and Twitter are not enough.
 The Creative Process and radical Differentiation; Supercharge your music to rise above the noise floor and achieve success
 The Live Show and Tour; How to Cut through the Glut and reach the Magic 300

2010

Los Angeles
New Music Seminar came to Los Angeles’s Henry Fonda Theater on Feb 2 as a one-day music, networking and educational extravaganza for industry professionals seeking to learn and understand how to help artists “rise above the noise floor” in a shifting musical landscape.

Featured players included: CMO Pepsi, Kevin Lyman, president/founder of Warp Tour, Alexandra Patsavas of Chop Shop Music, Justin Tranter, lead singer of Semi Precious Weapons, Derek Sivers, founder of CD Baby and Jason Bentley, program director of KCRW.

The full-day conference included four “movements” a.k.a. panels, live performances, the New Music Seminar “Artist on The Verge” contest winner performance and a great deal of networking both before, during and after the event.

The conference featured Keynote address followed by four Movements:
 1st Movement: Welcome to the Music Business; Everything you know is wrong. The New Definition of Success. 1000 True Fans and the Fan Relationship Pyramid.
 2nd Movement: Get Arrested; Marketing Yourself in the New Music Business – MySpace, Facebook and Twitter are not enough.
 3rd Movement: The Creative Process and radical Differentiation; Supercharge your music to rise above the noise floor and achieve success. A virtual A&R meeting.
 4th Movement: The Live Show and Tour; How to Cut through the Glut and reach the Magic 300 Ticket Mark

New York City
New Music Seminar announced that it would no longer remain a one-day conference and expand into a multi-day event from July 19 to 21 in New York City. The two-day, three-night conference included a symphony of five "movements" (focused discussions) over the course of two days, 8 TED-style presentations from key industry leaders, 22 mentoring sessions, nightly musical performances and ongoing networking opportunities. This seminar address both the artists’ dilemma of breaking out from the ever-growing glut of music releases and the development of a new business model for a sustainable music business.

NMS featured speakers included: Eric Garland (Big Champagne), Joe Kennedy (Pandora), Mike Doernberg (Reverbnation), Courtney Holt (Myspace Music), David Goodman (CBS Interactive), Little Steven (Underground Garage and the E Street Band), Ariel Hyatt (Ariel PR), Corey Denis (Not Shocking), Linda Lorence (SESAC), Jay Frank (CMT), Gwen Lipsky (Sound Thinking), Tom Jackson (onstagesuccess.com), Martin Atkins (Tour: Smart), John Simson (Soundexchange), Corrie Christopher (APA), Chris Vinson (Bandzoogle), and Tony Van Veen (Discmakers). The Artist Movement “conducted” by Margaret Cho featured star artists discussing how they got their break and tips on how to apply what worked for them.

2011–15
After a sold-out event in New York City on July 19–21, 2010, New Music Seminar returned to Los Angeles one day after the Grammys, with its 3-day event from February 14 through 16th, 2011, at the Sheraton Universal Hotel. The kickoff red carpet event, The After Grammy Jammy (the NMS Opening Night Party), was held at The Music Box in Hollywood on Monday night, February 14 with the “Artist on the Verge Finals”, which selects one artist who will walk away with over $50K in promotion and marketing, Tuesday, February 15 at The Roxy. The two-day, three-night conference included a symphony of five "movements" (focused discussions) over the course of two days, 12–18 minute Intensives (presentations) from key industry leaders, 22 mentoring sessions, daily and nightly musical performances, Summit Meetings and workshops on Rock, Hip Hop, Producers and Songwriting along with ongoing networking opportunities throughout.

On June 17–19, 2012, the New Music Seminar explored the exciting future of the music business with the SoundExchange Digital Broadcasting Summit and the BMI Creative Conclave; which took place at Webster Hall in New York City. The creative community and their label partners met the digital broadcasters, music bloggers, music technologists and all of the new music exposure and monetization players. Clear Channel CEO, Bob Pittman and Sean Parker were the keynote speakers and shared their vision for the future. Many sectors of the evolving new music business convened to discuss their perspectives for the exciting new future for the music business.

In 2013, the New Music Seminar, along with the SoundExchange Digital Broadcasting Summit, moved to the iconic New Yorker Hotel and held its opening night party at Webster Hall. 2013 marked a growth in international relationships spearheaded by the newly appointed General Manager, Peter Schwinge. Music showcases from France, Spain, and Sweden – an International Movement conducted by MIDEM, and an uptick in international sponsors and delegates enhanced the discussion throughout the global music community.
A new addition, to the benefit of artists, was the Music Xray A&R Listening and Critique room where artists had the opportunity to have their music listened to, and critiqued by reps from Atlantic Records, Republic Records, RCA Records, Virgin Records, Label Recruit, LOCAL VIBES, Glassnote Records, Razor & Tie, Robbins Entertainment, Island Def Jam, and Columbia Records.

There was a 2014 and 2015 event.

Similar events
Since the New Music Seminar's inception, many important music conferences worldwide have been formed, including SXSW, Winter Music Conference, In the City, CMJ and Canadian Music Week.

References

Music conferences
Music festivals in New York City